Doeg can refer to:

 Doeg the Edomite, a herdsman in the time of King David
 Doeg people, a Native American people in Northern Virginia in the 17th century, known for their role in Bacon's rebellion